Day Smith (born August 3, 1972 in Los Angeles, California) is an American flatland BMX rider. He has been riding professionally since 1993, sponsored by Hoffman Bikes and Split USA, and was featured in the videogame Mat Hoffman's Pro BMX 2 for PlayStation 2.

Film career
Smith has appeared in two films. The first, Sax's Final Orbit (1997) is a short subject drama about a flatland BMX rider named Sax (Ricardo Monlina) and his artist girlfriend Max (Bea Pompa). In addition to performing stunts for the film, Smith has a small role as the character Grim. Smith also appears as himself in Elusion (2006), a documentary which chronicles the history of BMX riding.

External links
Day Smith at EXPN
Day Smith at www.23mag.com
Sax's Final Orbit at IMDB
Elusion at IMDB

1972 births
Cyclists from Los Angeles
BMX riders
Living people